The Brazilian Association of Technical Standards, usually rendered in Portuguese as Associação Brasileira de Normas Técnicas (ABNT) is a private non-profit organization and the normative body which is responsible for technical standards in Brazil, and intends to promote technological development in the country. Brazilian national standards published by the association are named Norma Brasileira Regulamentadora and abbreviated NBR.

ABNT was founded in 1940. It was officially adopted by the Brazilian government in 1962.

It is a founding member of the International Organization for Standardization (ISO), the Panamerican Standards Commission (COPANT) and the Asociación Mercosur de Normalización (AMN).

ABNT is the exclusive representative of Brazil in the international organizations ISO and IEC and in the regional entities COPANT and AMN.

References

External links 
 

Electrical safety standards organizations
ISO member bodies
1940 establishments in Brazil
Organisations based in Rio de Janeiro (city)
Organisations based in São Paulo
Standards organisations in Brazil